The following is a list of leaders of the Russian Soviet Federative Socialist Republic (Russian SFSR). It lists heads of state, heads of government, and heads of the local branch of the Communist Party of the Soviet Union. Commonly referred to as Soviet Russia or simply Russia, the Russian SFSR was a sovereign state in 1917–1922, the largest, most populous, and most economically developed republic of the Soviet Union in 1922–1991, having its own legislation within the Union in 1990–91.

Heads of state

Heads of government

Heads of party

See also
 Supreme Soviet of Russia
 List of heads of state of Russia
 List of heads of government of Russia
 List of leaders of the Soviet Union
 List of heads of state of the Soviet Union
 Premier of the Soviet Union

References

Citations

Sources 

 World Statesmen.org

RSFSR leaders
RSFSR leaders
RSFSR Head of State
 
RSFSR
Politics of the Soviet Union